THAP domain-containing protein 1 is a protein that in humans is encoded by the THAP1 gene. The synonyme is DYT6 (Dystonia 6).

Function 

The protein encoded by this gene contains a THAP domain, a conserved DNA-binding domain. This protein colocalizes with the apoptosis response protein PAWR/PAR-4 in promyelocytic leukemia (PML) nuclear bodies, and functions as a proapoptotic factor that links PAWR to PML nuclear bodies. Alternatively spliced transcript variants encoding distinct isoforms have been observed.

Interactions 

THAP1 has been shown to interact with PAWR.

Clinical significance 

Thanatos-associated [THAP] domain-containing apoptosis-associated protein 1 (THAP1) is a DNA-binding protein that has been associated with DYT6 dystonia, a hereditary movement disorder involving sustained, involuntary muscle contractions.

References

Further reading

External links 
 
 Link to Wikigenes DYT6  -  dystonia 6, torsion (autosomal dominant) 
 Link to Wikigenes THAP1  -  THAP domain containing, apoptosis